The National Amateur Cup, also known as the USASA Amateur Cup, is an American soccer competition open to all amateur teams affiliated with the United States Soccer Federation through United States Adult Soccer Association (USASA).

In 1923, U.S. Soccer established the National Amateur Cup in response to the growing number of teams entering the open National Challenge Cup (now known as the U.S. Open Cup). The 1923 competition was played through the semifinals, however the tournament was never completed due to inclement weather.

While the USSF originally managed the competition, that responsibility is now held by the United States Adult Soccer Association (USASA).

Starting with the 2019 U.S. Open Cup, the winner of the previous year's National Amateur Cup qualifies for the U.S. Open Cup tournament proper, bypassing the local qualification process.

Champions

Men

Women

References

External links 
 USASA National Amateur Cup

 
Soccer cup competitions in the United States
American soccer trophies and awards
1923 establishments in the United States